Claire Porter (born December 23, 1942) is an American choreographer/comedian known for blending comedic monologues with dance movement.  She is also an award-winning performer, author, and dance educator whose dance works, which she refers to as Portables, have been produced by various dance organizations, college theater programs and venues around the world.

Biography
Claire Porter was born in New Britain, Connecticut, where, as a child, she was a star athlete and danced in a local studio.  After she earned her BA in Mathematics from the College of New Rochelle in New York, she became a computer programmer for G.E. Analytical Engineering in Schenectady, New York. Porter returned to her dancing roots after witnessing a performance by Maria Tallchief. She then attended Sonoma State University in California from 1969 to 1973. At Sonoma State, she studied dance, taught Family Dance, Exercise, and Children's Dance, and directed a dance company of 12 members. Porter eventually moved from California to Ohio to study dance at Ohio State University. It was there that Porter discovered Laban Movement Analysis and began exploring gestures, acting, writing, and voice. She later received her certification for Laban Movement Analysis at the Laban/Bartenieff Institute of Movement Studies NYC. She earned her MA in Dance from Ohio State and has continued the exploration of gestural movement as a teacher, choreographer and performer.

Porter has been a resident of Teaneck, New Jersey.

Major works

Portables
Porter's Portables are a number of comedic movement monologues and group theater dance pieces. Although these works have taken the comedic route, they were not initially created to be funny. The comedic interpretation was a result of how her audience viewed her works. She came up with the name Portables when she was leaving Ohio State University. It is a pun on Porter's last name as well as a sentimental way of signifying that she planned to take her dance works with her when she graduated. She is also said to call her works Portables because they can be performed in both small and large spaces.  Each Portable is about 12 minutes in length, so about 5 or 6 Portables are performed at each concert.

Portables: solo works and some brief descriptions
 Namely, Muscles 
 Piano – A pianist is ready to perform for an audience, but the piano hasn't arrived
 Lost in the Modern – Contemplation of modern life and art
 Green Dress Circle
 Fund Raiser – A solicitor for funds has to deal with a hostile audience
 Fitness Digest – A physical fitness teacher conducts a class of imaginary pupils
 Homestretch
 Dining Out – A calm diner grows increasingly tipsy.
 Slipping into Weather
 Lecture
 Ordering Greens
 Mulch
 If My Words Wore Boots
 Planted Feet

Portables: group works and some brief descriptions
 It’s About Time
 Time Walking
 Walk Walk Walk
 Between the Lines
 Frieze Frame
 Boot Reports
 Too Much on My Plate – Waiters and waitresses struggle with more than just the specials of the day
 Sweeps
 Panel – Two men and two women make up the International Decisions Panel, which makes decisions about the possibility of making decisions.

Critical reviews
 “Panel, though often amusing, lacked a truly effective comic punchline. However, Laura Clayton's nervous score perfectly matched the nervous choreography.”
 “The solo was intermittently funny. But Ms. Porter is rather self-conscious about it all, and Piano becomes an unfulfilled one-joke piece.”
 “Ms. Porter made her points economically. She could have roamed nervously about, demonstrating outlandish exercises; she could have assigned other dancers the roles of timid or bumbling students. Instead, she kept her sketch a solo and sat on a stool. And by doing little - but by doing everything so that the slightest movement counted - she made Fitness Digest a satirical cartoon drawn in black ink with the sharpest of strokes.”
 “The effect of "Fitness Digest" was of wandering into an aerobics class conducted by a mild-mannered lunatic at breakneck speed.”
 “The setting was a little restaurant surrounded by trees festooned hauntingly with coats, designed by Power Boothe. A wistful blank-faced waiter, played by Ms. Porter, prepares the table then leaves, to be followed onstage by Ms. Porter as the diner.  She looks at first like a beautiful, solitary young woman Jacques Tati might spot across the room in a seaside cafe. Her diner is pure Beatrice Lillie by the end, tipsy on pink wine but still tilting at the world. It is deft physical comedy of a high order, as poignant as it is funny.”
 “While Ms. Porter refers to her short, engaging works as “portables,” in other hands they could easily become trifles. But she doesn't obscure her work with pretense; the first goal is to entertain, and in her best efforts she achieves even more.”
 "Porter's deliciously wild humor erupts through her studies like fire. Her subsequent gestural analysis is as rigorous as any anthropological kinesic study. Her work is smart, musical and skilled." - H. B. Kronen, The Morning Union, Springfield, MA
 "Droll and beautifully observed character studies." - Burt Supree, The Village Voice

Teaching experiences
 Wagner College
 Grand Valley College where she worked on gestural pieces including a piece in American Sign Language
 Columbia Teachers College where she taught Choreography and Laban Movement Analysis
 Hope College
 Manhattanville College 
 Purchase College 
 Connecticut College
 CASE Western Reserve University

Books by Claire Porter
 Dynamics in a Bag (self-published) – teaches about the range of dynamics in movement
 Namely, Muscles (self-published) – book of 37 poems on over 68 muscles
 Don’t Answer That (under construction) – bag of question cards to help choreographers create dance pieces
 Laban Bag – The Effort Qualities (under construction) – bag of theatre game cards for understanding Laban's Effort Qualities

Nominations, awards and achievements
 Received numerous National Endowment for the Arts Choreography Fellowships 
 Received numerous New Jersey State Council on the Arts Choreography Fellowships
 Awarded the College of Arts and Sciences’ Creative Achievement Award at Ohio State University
 Awarded the Mather Professorship at CASE Western Reserve University 
 Nominated for the CalArts/Alpert Award

References

External links
Video from PENTACLE of Claire Porter performing in Fund Raiser 
Claire Porter/PORTABLES
PENTACLE About: Claire Porter/PORTABLES
PENTACLE Artist Gallery: Claire Porter/PORTABLES

1942 births
Living people
American choreographers
College of New Rochelle alumni
Ohio State University alumni
People from New Britain, Connecticut
People from Teaneck, New Jersey
Sonoma State University alumni